Papanasam block is a revenue block in the Papanasam taluk of Thanjavur district, Tamil Nadu, India. There are 34 villages in this block and it is co-extensive with Papanasam taluk.

List of Panchayat Villages

References 

 

Revenue blocks of Thanjavur district